Levi Leslie Andoh (born 12 March 2000) is a Dutch footballer who plays as a defender for Hereford.

Early and personal life
His parents are Ghanaian, but he was born in Amsterdam and moved to England at the age of 6.

Career
Andoh joined Aston Villa's academy at the age of 6, before being released at the age of 14. He subsequently had trial spells at Port Vale, Walsall and Wolverhampton Wanderers, but was rejected by all three.

During the 2017–18 season, he played for Cradley Town, before playing for Thompson Rivers University between September 2018 and December 2018. He joined Worcester City in February 2019, before joining Solihull United later that year.

Following a trial spell at the club, he agreed to join Ipswich Town on a two-year contract from January 2020 in December 2019.

On 9 October 2020, he joined Lowestoft Town on loan for a month. He made 3 league appearances in the Southern League Premier Division Central and one appearance in the FA Trophy.

He made his debut for Ipswich on 10 November 2020, starting in a 2–0 EFL Trophy defeat away to Crawley Town.

On 17 September 2021, it was announced that Andoh had joined Hereford, initially on a one-month loan. His loan was later extended, and he made 11 league appearances before returning to Ipswich in January 2022. Andoh was released at the end of the 2021–22 season.

After short spells with both Buxton and Hednesford Town, Andoh re-joined Hereford on a permanent basis on 1 January 2023. That same day, he scored on his debut in a 1-1 draw against Kidderminster Harriers.

References

External links
 
 

Living people
Dutch footballers
Dutch sportspeople of Ghanaian descent
Footballers from Amsterdam
Association football defenders
Cradley Town F.C. players
Worcester City F.C. players
Ipswich Town F.C. players
Lowestoft Town F.C. players
Midland Football League players
Southern Football League players
Dutch expatriate footballers
Expatriate footballers in England
Dutch expatriate sportspeople in England
Expatriate soccer players in Canada
Dutch expatriate sportspeople in Canada
2000 births